The Nigerian Economic Summit Group (NESG) is a private sector-led think-tank and policy advocacy group based in Nigeria. The NESG promotes sustainable growth and the development of the Nigerian economy. It is a non profit, non-partisan and apolitical organization. It was founded in 1994 and was incorporated as a non-profit in 1996.

The objectives of the NESG include building a first-class research institution to help support stakeholders in the execution of policies, articulate programs and strategies in response to any emerging trends in national and world economy and having a clear economic action agenda.

History
At the First Summit in February 1993, national leaders explored 1992-2020 global scenarios and defined the principles for building a competitive economy in Nigeria, across what the delegates called 'New Frontiers'. This consisted of Education, Stabilization, Privatisation, Deregulation, Infrastructurisation, and Democratisation. After days of dialogue and deliberations, the Federal Government at NES #1 adopted the underlying economic philosophy that would be the premise of 21st Century Nigeria.

Over successive Economic Summits, this economic philosophy formed the basis of reform proposals culminating in several National Development Agendas. By NES#3 (1996), the National Stakeholder Consensus was that there was a need for a National Vision. This Summit proposed a National Vision Statement for Nigeria by 2025: “Nigeria will be a well ordered, well-governed, just and prosperous nation, united in a sustained endeavor”. It also proposed a 'Change Program' from 1996 to 2010, laying the foundation for the 'Vision 2010' agenda. Following the extensive recommendations of the NES#3, Nigeria's 'Vision 2010' Committee, consisting of 240 members who were primarily from the NESG, submitted the 'Vision 2010' report; hence NES#4 was dedicated to its implementation.

By 2001, Nigeria had transformed into a modern 21st-Century African Democracy and with a growth rate of 10%. World Bank Reports noted Nigeria in the 'MINT' nations with the economic potential to join the 'BRICS' nations, as well as the top league of 20 most prosperous nations in the world. The need for a more robust and ambitious agenda was recommended. This led to the articulation of the 'National Economic Empowerment Development Strategy (NEEDS)' and the corresponding 'State Economic Empowerment Development Strategies (SEEDS)' in NES#10 and its subsequent implementation in NES#11 in 2005. With the NEEDS-SEEDS synergies in place, the National Stakeholders noted the lack of clarity in terms of Nigeria's Vision on a Sector-by-Sector basis, and in cognizance of the global narratives of Nigeria joining the league of 20, in the middle of successful on-going reforms across sectors like Telecommunications, Transportation, Banking and Finance and Pensions. This led to the 2007 Summit Agenda Theme: 'Nigeria: Positioning for the Top 20 League', which was accentuated by the articulation of the 'Vision 20:2020'.  Nigeria's 'Vision 20:2020' was, therefore, an NES-inspired national effort aimed at growing and developing Nigeria, Africa's most populous nation, and bringing her to the league of the world's 20 leading economies by the year 2020.

The Nigerian 'Vision 20:2020' set a national agenda with ambitious targets and objectives to achieve rapid economic growth and to be one of the highest-ranking 20 economies in GDP size. An analysis at how Vision 20:2020 has fared over the past ten years of its adoption and implementation shows very poor performance. Since 2009, Nigeria has had two administrations with their own individual socioeconomic development plans, which ‘in principle’ coincide with the terms of Vision 20:2020. The latest of these plans is the 'Economic Recovery and Growth Plan (ERGP)' 2017–2020; a plan aimed at much-needed economic recovery in the short-term that set a pathway for sustained and inclusive economic growth.

Nigerian Economic Summit 

The Nigerian Economic Summit (NES) is the flagship event of the NESG and it is organized in collaboration with the national planning commission (NPC). The Nigerian Economic Summit has consistently focused on job creation, small and medium-sized enterprises (SME) growth, competitiveness, dismantling the pillars of corruption, encouraging sustainable growth and development and aligning home-grown long-term development agenda with the UN sustainable development goals. For 25 years, the Nigerian Economic Summit Group has accomplished a great deal in terms of research outputs and the implementation of programs, including seminars, conferences, and workshops.

Start-up Pitching Event 
The Start-ups Pitching Event was introduced by the Nigerian Economic Summit Group as part of its flagship event, the Nigerian Economic Summit (NES) in 2017. It serves as a platform for entrepreneurs to grow and fund their businesses. The start-up Pitching event comes wit opportunities for mentorship and professional advisory services. The Start-Ups Pitching Event also was held in 2019 in the 25th anniversary Summit with the winners receiving grants.

Innovation Workshop 
The NES 26 Innovation Workshop served as a successor to the Start-up Pitching Event.

Policy Commissions
The 13 policy commissions are as follows:

 Energy Policy commission
 Science and Innovation policy commission
 Manufacturing and solid minerals development policy commission
 Agriculture and food security policy commission
 Infrastructure and logistics policy commission
 Education policy commission
 Governance and institutions policy commission
 Trade investment and competitiveness policy commission
 Finance, financial inclusion and financial markets policy commission
 Sustainability policy commission
 Tourism, Hospitality, Entertainment, Creative Industries and Sport as a Business
Health policy commission
Digital Economy policy commission

The structure of the Policy Commissions of the NESG is made up of sub-groups which are otherwise known as Thematic groups. There are 44 thematic groups that make up the policy commission structure of the NESG.

Partnerships

NESG/NGF Economic Roundtable (NNER) 
The NESG/NGF Economic Roundtable (NNER) roundtable is a partnership between the Nigerian Governors’ Forum and the NESG. The roundtable works with sub-nationals to promote economic cooperation in clusters capable of taking advantage of economic corridors to create jobs in logistics, agriculture, storage and others.

Nigeria Triple Helix Roundtable (NTHR) 
The Nigeria Triple Helix Roundtable (NTHR) was launched on the 20th of Sept 2019 as a permanent platform for implementing the government-academia-industry collaboration towards fostering economic growth and national development in Nigeria. It is the first practical expression of the Triple-Helix model in the country, coming after the signing of an MoU between the National Universities Commission (NUC) (for academia) and the Nigerian Economic Summit Group (NESG) (for industry), and the interactive session and retreat which held thereafter.

While the primary objective of the academia-industry collaboration is to revitalize the Nigeria higher education system, the broader long-term objective is to facilitate a tripartite partnership between the government, academia and industry such that the three actors can actively collaborate to develop solutions to critical problems and implement an agenda for economic growth. The NTHR seeks to enhance collaboration between these actors for the primary objective of stimulating growth by transitioning into an innovation-led and knowledge-driven economy.

Debt Management Roundtable (DMR) 
The Debt Management Roundtable (DMR) on debt restructuring and social financing was instituted in March 2021 by the Nigerian Economic Summit Group (NESG) with the support of the Open Society Initiative for West Africa (OSIWA). The Roundtable is expected to provide insights, evidence and recommendations on debt management and sustainability, with a view to engaging policymakers on debt restructuring and social financing in the West African region, using Nigeria as a case study. Public debts in ECOWAS have spiraled upwards more than four folds since the debt relief period (2005-2006).

NESG Bridge Fellowship 
The NESG Bridge Fellowship was initiated in the year 2019 by the board of directors to celebrate the 25th Anniversary of the Nigerian Economic Summit (NES#25). The NESG, in collaboration with LEAP Africa, launched the NESG Bridge Fellowship, with the goal to equip a new cadre of young visionary leaders with leadership, research and policy advocacy skills to contribute to policy reform in Nigeria.

Interventions

National Agriculture Seeds Council Act 
The NESG engaged in advocacy programs prior to the passage and signing into law of the National Agriculture seeds council Act 2019. The Act seeks to make the seeds market more structured and enables the National Agricultural Seeds Council (NASC) to regularly publish the National Seed Catalogues showing seed and price varieties eligible for certification in Nigeria.

Fertiliser Quality Control Act 
The NESG and other stakeholders partnered to ensure the passage of the Fertiliser Quality Control Bill 2019 to help safeguard farmers against nutrient deficiencies that may occur as a result of the use of adulterated fertilisers. The Act also seeks to create an enabling environment for businesses in the fertiliser industry to thrive and Improve the productivity of the agriculture sector.

Plant Variety Protection (PVP) Bill 
The NESG in partnership with the Partnership for Inclusive Agricultural Transformation in Africa (PIATA), together with AGRA, the Rockefeller Foundation, Bill & Melinda Gates Foundation and USAID, collaborated with the National Agricultural Seed Council (NASC) to support the enaction of legislation that will provide a plant variety protection system for Nigeria. The PVP when passed into law is expected to incentivize national and multinational agribusiness investments and aid the development of Nigeria's Agriculture value chain.

National Food Safety & Quality Bill (Foodorado) 
The Nigerian Economic Summit Group (NESG) in its drive to ensure safe, nutritious and affordable foods for all Nigerians is supporting the enactment and passage of a food safety and Quality Bill. Through the National Assembly Business Environment Roundtable (NASSBER), the Partnership for Inclusive Agricultural Transformation in Africa (PIATA), together with AGRA, the Rockefeller Foundation, Bill & Melinda Gates Foundation and USAID, the NESG has been collaborating with the Federal ministry of health and other relevant ministries and agencies of government to support the enaction of legislation that will support and enhance food safety and security for Nigeria.

NASSBER 
The National Assembly Business Environment Roundtable (NASSBER) was established in 2016 as a partnership between the National Assembly, NESG and Nigerian Bar Association – Section on Business Law with support from the ENABLE2 programme of the UK Department of International Development to intervene in improving the business environment as a pathway to economic growth and development using legislative instruments.

NESG Radio 
The Nigerian Economic Summit Group (NESG) launched its radio and podcast services in February of 2021with the aim of extending research-based advocacy and impactful policy-making to all Nigerians, including the urban technology inclined audiences, as well as rural dwellers.

“In our effort to extend critical information to all Nigerians in the diaspora, urban, semi-urban and rural areas, the NESG is creating a traditional syndicated podcast that will effectively inform urban and rural dwellers with distilled localised content and helps communicate programmes that drive inclusiveness to all Nigerians.” ‘ Laoye Jaiyeola, chief executive officer, NESG said.

Policy Innovation Unit (PIU) 
The PIU is an initiative within the NESG that is sponsored by Rockefeller Philanthropy Advisors, with the support of the Bill and Melinda Gates Foundation.  It seeks to improve the design and implementation of government policies and programmes in Nigeria through lessons from behavioural and social science as well as other policy tools. Working with public bodies, the private sector, NGOs and the international community, the PIU will also support ongoing efforts on critical priorities such as the Sustainable Development Goals (SDGs).

The Nigerian Policy Innovation Unit is the first public policy institution in sub-Saharan Africa dedicated to the use of behavioral theory, tools and testing to inform social program/policy design and implementation. The PIU's vision is to become Nigeria's foremost domestic behavioural science organisation, supporting efficient and effective governance through behavioural studies. PIU seeks to improve policy design and programme implementation in Nigeria and to embed a culture of evidence-based policy-making in government.

References

External links
Official website

Economic development in Nigeria
Business organizations based in Nigeria